Nicholas Egon FRSA FKC, (15 November 1921 – 25 April 2017) was a national of Czechoslovakia  who emigrated to the United Kingdom where he became a leading portrait painter.

He first came to the United Kingdom about 1938. Near the end of World War II he served as the official artist with the British military in Basra.

References

External links

1921 births
2017 deaths
Czechoslovak emigrants to the United Kingdom
British painters
Portrait painters
British expatriates in Iraq